Kudashevo (Qoźaş) is a rural locality (a village) in Imangulovsky Selsoviet, Uchalinsky District, Bashkortostan, Russia. The population was 377 as of 2010. There are 10 streets.

Geography 
Kudashevo is located 17 km southwest of Uchaly (the district's administrative centre) by road. Rasulevo is the nearest rural locality.

References 

Rural localities in Uchalinsky District